Welcome is the fifth studio album by Santana, released in 1973. It followed the jazz-fusion formula that the preceding Caravanserai had inaugurated, but with an expanded and different lineup this time. Gregg Rolie had left the band along with Neal Schon to form Journey, and they were replaced by Tom Coster, Richard Kermode and Leon Thomas, along with guest John McLaughlin, who had collaborated with Carlos Santana on Love Devotion Surrender. Welcome also featured John Coltrane's widow, Alice, as a pianist on the album's opening track, "Going Home" and Flora Purim (the wife of Airto Moreira) on vocals. This album was far more experimental than the first four albums, and Welcome did not produce any hit singles.

In 2003, the album was re-released with a bonus track, "Mantra", described by AllMusic reviewer Thom Jurek as "a killer improv tune with a ferocious bass solo by Rauch and insane drumming by Shrieve."

Reception

Writing for Rolling Stone, Robert Palmer called Welcome "the most rhythmically satisfying rock recording since Professor Longhair's," and noted that the rhythm section is "at its loosest and best." He commented: "There may not be another 'Black Magic Woman' here, but there is enough of the old Latin fire to satisfy the fans, as well as a promising expansion of sources and resources."

Critic Robert Christgau stated that the album "proves that a communion of multipercussive rock and transcendentalist jazz can move the unenlightened--me, for instance. Good themes, good playing, good beat, and let us not forget good singing."

In a review for AllMusic, Thom Jurek wrote: "Welcome is a jazz record with rock elements, not a rock record that flirted with jazz and Latin musical forms... Welcome was... ahead of its time as a musical journey and is one of the more enduring recordings the band ever made. This is a record that pushes the envelope even today and is one of the most inspired recordings in the voluminous Santana oeuvre."

Jeff Winbush of All About Jazz described the album as "the summit of Santana's jazz fusion era," and remarked: "The secret weapon is Michael Shrieve's energetic drumming and the dual keyboard attack of Coster and Kermode. They push and pull Santana to go beyond and stop holding back."

Track listing

Side one

Side two

2003 remastered CD edition bonus track

Personnel

Band members
 Carlos Santana – electric guitar (2-5,7-9), acoustic guitar (2), bass guitar (6), kalimba (6), percussion (1,7), vocals (2), producer
 Tom Coster – Yamaha organ (1,4,6,8), Hammond organ (2,4,5), electric piano (3,7), acoustic piano (6,8,9), organ (7), marimba (6), percussion (3), strings arrangements (7), producer
 Richard Kermode – Hammond organ (1,3,8), mellotron (1), electric piano (2,4-7,9), acoustic piano (5), marimba (4), shekere (4,6), percussion (3)
 Douglas Rauch – bass guitar (1-5,7-9)
 Michael Shrieve – drums (1,2,4-8), producer
 José "Chepito" Areas – percussion (3,9), congas (3), timbales (2,3,6,7)
 Armando Peraza – percussion (1,3,9) congas (2,4-8), bongos (4), cabasa (5)
 Leon Thomas – lead vocals (2, 4, 7), whistling (5)

Additional musicians
 Alice Coltrane – piano (1, 9), organ and Farfisa organ (1) Arrangement (1, 7)
 Wendy Haas – vocals (2, 4)
 Flora Purim – lead vocals (5)
 John McLaughlin – guitar (8)
 Joe Farrell – solo flute (4)
 Bob Yance – flute (4, 5)
 Mel Martin – flute (4, 5)
 Douglas Rodriguez – rhythm guitar (4)
 Tony Smith – drums (3)
 Jules Broussard – soprano saxophone (6)
 Greg Adams – strings arrangements (7)

Production
 Glen Kolotkin - engineer
 Bob Irwin - 2003 CD reissue producer

Charts

Certifications

References

Santana (band) albums
1973 albums
Columbia Records albums
Albums produced by Carlos Santana